The Rolls-Royce RB.162 is a lightweight British turbojet engine produced by Rolls-Royce Limited. Developed in the early 1960s, it was specially designed for use as a lift engine for VTOL aircraft but was also used in a later variant of the Hawker Siddeley Trident airliner as an auxiliary boost engine. A smaller related variant, the RB.181 remained a design project only, as did a turbofan version designated RB.175.

Design and development
The RB.162 was designed to meet an anticipated need for a lift engine to power VTOL aircraft with the emphasis on simplicity, durability and lightweight construction. Development costs were shared by Britain, France and Germany after signing a joint memorandum of agreement. The engine featured fibre glass compressor casings and plastic compressor blades to save weight which also had the effect of reducing production costs. The engine has no oil system, a metered dose of oil instead being injected into the two main bearings by the compressed air used to turn the compressor at startup. Although the RB.162 was a successful design, the expected large VTOL aircraft market did not materialise and the engine was only produced in limited numbers.

Development for the Trident
In 1966 British European Airways (BEA) had a requirement for an extended range aircraft to serve Mediterranean destinations. After a plan to operate a mixed fleet of Boeing 727 and 737 aircraft was not approved by the British Government Hawker Siddeley offered BEA a stretched and improved performance version of the Trident that they were already operating. This variant, the Trident 3B, used, in addition to its three Rolls-Royce Spey turbofan engines, a centrally mounted RB.162-86 which was used for takeoff and climb in the hot prevailing conditions of the Mediterranean area. The 'boost' engine was shut down for cruising flight. Some conversion was needed for the change from vertical to horizontal installation. With the RB.162 fitted the Trident 3B had a 15% increase in thrust over the earlier variants for an engine weight penalty of only 5%.

RB175 and 181
A design study for a turbofan version of the RB.162 was designated RB175.<ref>[http://www.flightglobal.com/pdfarchive/view/1965/1965%20-%200043.html Flight International, 7 January 1965] www.flightglobal.com Retrieved: 31 December 2009</ref> Another projected derivative, the RB.181 was to be a scaled-down version of the RB.162 producing approximately 2,000 lbs of thrust. Seven of these lift engines were to power the unbuilt Lockheed/Short Brothers CL-704 VTOL variant of the F-104 Starfighter.

Applications
 Dassault Mirage IIIV
 Dornier Do 31
 Hawker Siddeley Trident 3B
 VFW VAK 191B

Engines on display
A preserved Rolls-Royce RB.162 is on public display at the Royal Air Force Museum Cosford.
An RB.162-4D is on display at the Deutsches Museum, Munich.
An RB.162 is on display in the Foyer in the Department Of Engineering at the University of Liverpool.
A part-sectioned RB.162 is on display at the Rolls-Royce Heritage Trust Collection, (Derby). 
An RB162-86 (from Trident 3) is on display at the East Midlands Aeropark, adjacent to the East Midlands Airport.

Specifications (RB.162-86)

See also

References

Notes

Bibliography

Gunston, Bill. World Encyclopedia of Aero Engines. Cambridge, England. Patrick Stephens Limited, 1989. 
Swanborough, Gordon. Air Enthusiast, Volume One. London: Pilot Press, 1971. .

External links

Image of Rolls-Royce RB.162
Cutaway drawing of an RB.162
RB.162 article with images (French language)
The Trident Preservation Society
"RB.162 - First of the Lift Jets" - a 1963 Flight'' article on the RB.162

1960s turbojet engines
RB162
Lift jet